Dangerously Suite is an album by American jazz saxophonist Hamiet Bluiett recorded in 1980 and released on the Italian Soul Note label.

Reception

In his review for AllMusic, Milo Fine states the session "tried a bit too hard to cover all the "Black music" bases from ballads to swing to blues to gospel to funk. The group played well, but only a few surface levels of feeling/commitment seemed to be explored."

Track listing
All compositions by Hamiet Bluiett except as indicated
 "Between the Raindrops" - 8:17
 "Ballad of Eddie Jefferson" - 6:35
 "Full, Deep and Mellow" - 6:48
 "Prayer" (Chief Bey) - 1:20
 "Blues for Atlanta Georgia" - 5:08
 "Mighty Denn" - 4:22
 "Doll Baby" - 4:17
 "Oasis" - 5:39
 "Rain Shout" (Chief Bey, Hamiet Bluiett) - 1:58

Personnel
Hamiet Bluiett - baritone saxophone, alto clarinet
Bob Neloms - piano
Buster Williams - bass
Jabali Billy Hart - drums
Chief Bey - African percussion
Irene Datcher - vocals

References

1981 albums
Hamiet Bluiett albums
Black Saint/Soul Note albums